Eadberht of Lindisfarne (died 6 May 698), also known as Saint Eadberht, was Bishop of Lindisfarne, England, from 688 until his death on 6 May 698.

Life
After the death of Saint Cuthbert in 687, Wilfrid acted as administrator of the see of Lindisfarne. His brief tenure was confrontational. Eadberht was consecrated bishop of Lindisfarne in 688. He is credited with securing the buildings of St. Finan’s wooden church with lead, making them more durable. He is also notable as having founded the holy shrine of his predecessor Saint Cuthbert on the island of Lindisfarne, a place that was to become a centre of great pilgrimage in later years.

It is said that Eadberht favoured poverty and long periods of solitude and devotion as part of his service in the bishopric. He was known for his great knowledge of scripture and for giving a tenth of everything to the poor. When he died he was buried in the same location from which Cuthbert's body had been exhumed earlier the same year. When the monks withdrew from the Island in 875 Eadberht's relics were eventually moved to Durham.

Citations

References

External links
 
 Patron Saints Index
 Catholic Online Saints and Angels

698 deaths
7th-century English bishops
7th-century Christian saints
Bishops of Lindisfarne
Northumbrian saints
English Christian monks
Year of birth unknown